The women's 4x100 metres relay event at the 2008 World Junior Championships in Athletics was held in Bydgoszcz, Poland, at Zawisza Stadium on 11 and 12 July.

Medalists

Results

Final
12 July

Heats
11 July

Heat 1

Heat 2

Heat 3

Participation
According to an unofficial count, 94 athletes from 23 countries participated in the event.

References

4 x 100 metres relay
Relays at the World Athletics U20 Championships
2008 in women's athletics